The Conservatory of Ho Chi Minh City is a conservatory located at 112, Nguyen Du Street, District 1, Ho Chi Minh City, Vietnam that provides music education in undergraduate, graduate and postgraduate level for the southern region of Vietnam. It is one of three conservatories in Vietnam (besides Hanoi Conservatory of Music and Hue Conservatory).

History
Historically, the precursor of this university was Music Division of Gia Dinh Art College. In 1956, this Division is split from Gia Dinh Art College to become National Conservatory of Music. When the dramatics faculty was added to the school education programme, this school was renamed National Music and Dramatics School with 2 main education fields: music (European music and Vietnamese national music or Vietnamese traditional music) and dramatics (principally Vietnamese traditional dramatics).

After the Fall of Saigon on April 30, 1975, the school was renamed Ho Chi Minh City National Music School. The dramatics division was split to establish Ho Chi Minh City Dramatics School (today Ho Chi Minh City Cinematics and Dramatics College) in 1976.

From 1978, the dancing education program was added to the school education scope. On February 2, 1980, the school was given university status by the Vietnamese government and was renamed Ho Chi Minh City Conservatory.

Education courses
The schools scope of education includes the following courses:
 Long-term Intermediate Degree (in 6; 7 or 9 years for students from 9 years old or above).
 Short-term Intermediate Degree (in 4 years for students from 15 to 24 years old).
 Bachelor in 4 years (for students from 18 years old or above).
 Master in 2 years.
 Doctorate in 3 years

Faculties
 Theory, music composition and conducting.
 Piano
 Symphony Musical Instrument including string (violon, violoncelle, violonalto, contrebasse), clarinet (Flute, Hautbois, Clarinet, Basson, Cor, Trompette, Trombone, Tuba) and Percussion.
 Vocal singing
 Vietnamese Traditional Musical Instrument (two-chord fiddle, monochord, 36-chord zither, bamboo flute).
 Guitar, mandolin, accordion.

Organization
There are over 100 lecturers, many of which are famous musicians, composers and researchers, and experienced pedagogogists graduated from European conservatoires in world's most famous music centres (including Russia, Eastern European countries, the United Kingdom, France, Italy, and  Germany). The conservatoire tends to teach classical music schools for their students. Apart from the education program, the conservatoire hold some orchestras:
 A symphony orchestra
 An adult orchestra
 A child orchestra
 A Vietnamese traditional orchestra
 Guitar, Mandoline, Accordéon (GMAC) orchestra
There are two concert rooms (500 seats and 100 seats respectively) with two performances weekly
Many of the conservatoire graduates has become famous singers and composers in the country. The conservatoire has won many medals and awards nationally and internationally, namely:
 Award at J.B.Bach International Concours in Leipzig, Germany in 1980
 Two first awards in National Concours in 1986
 Autumne Concours in 1993: Violon first award (adult), violon second award (children)
The conservatoire has been awarded several Labor Medals by Vietnamese presidents

References

External links
 Official Website (English & Vietnamese)

Universities in Ho Chi Minh City
Music schools in Vietnam